Miliće (Serbian Cyrillic: Милиће), is a village in Serbia, located in the municipality of Kraljevo, in Raška District. In 2002, it had 293 inhabitants, all Serbs.

Miliće is located on the banks of the Studenica River.

Notes and references

See also 
 List of cities, towns and villages in Serbia

Populated places in Raška District